Juan Feliciano (born April 6, 1980) is a Dominican former baseball player.  He played for the Hiroshima Toyo Carp in the Central League.

References

External links

1980 births
Living people
Águilas Cibaeñas players
Bet Shemesh Blue Sox players
Dominican Republic expatriate baseball players in Israel
Dominican Republic expatriate baseball players in Japan
Dominican Republic expatriate baseball players in Mexico
Hiroshima Toyo Carp players
Mexican League baseball pitchers
Nippon Professional Baseball pitchers
Petroleros de Minatitlán players
Sportspeople from Santo Domingo